King's Hill is one of the highest points in the county of Hampshire, England. Its prominence of 46 metres qualifies it as one of England's TuMPs.

King's Hill is situated in the parish of Bentworth. It lies on the Abbey Road between the villages of Medstead and Beech. To the northeast is Alton Abbey. Chawton Park Wood lies to the south of the open hilltop.

References 

Hills of Hampshire